Ancochaullane (possibly from Aymara janq'u white, chawlla, challwa, fish, -ni a suffix to indicate ownership, "the one with white fish" or "the white one with fish") is a mountain in the Barroso mountain range in the Andes of Peru, about  high. It is located in the Tacna Region, Tacna Province, Palca District. Ancochaullane lies north of the mountain Huancune.

Ancochaullane is also the name of a little populated place northeast of the mountain.

References 

Mountains of Tacna Region
Populated places in the Tacna Region
Mountains of Peru